Peski is a rural locality (a village) in Igmasskoye Rural Settlement, Nyuksensky District, Vologda Oblast, Russia. The population was 101 as of 2002.

Geography 
Peski is located 45 km southwest of Nyuksenitsa (the district's administrative centre) by road. Kirillovo is the nearest rural locality.

References 

Rural localities in Nyuksensky District